The United States Medical Licensing Examination (USMLE) is a three-step examination program for medical licensure in the United States sponsored by the Federation of State Medical Boards (FSMB) and the National Board of Medical Examiners (NBME). Physicians with a Doctor of Medicine (MD) degree are required to pass the USMLE for medical licensure. However, those with a Doctor of Osteopathic Medicine degree (DO) are required to take the COMLEX-USA (COMLEX) exams.

States may enact additional testing and/or licensing requirements.

Description and Purpose
The United States Medical Licensing Examination (USMLE) is a multistep assessment required for medical licensure in the United States by all graduates of  M.D.-granting American medical schools as well as all graduates of international medical schools. It consists of three examinations:
 Step 1: Assesses foundational medical science typically obtained during the first two years of medical school
 Step 2CK: Evaluates the applicant's knowledge of clinical medicine
 Step 3: Assesses the application of clinical knowledge to patient management

Previously, USMLE included a clinical skills portion called USMLE Step 2 Clinical Skills. It was discontinued during the COVID-19 pandemic.

Step 1 and 2 are typically completed by U.S. medical students during medical school, while Step 3 is usually taken by the end of the first year of residency. While the USMLE Step 1 and Step 2 CK exams can be taken at Prometric test centers worldwide, the Step 3 can only be taken in the United States.

The USMLE is sponsored by the Federation of State Medical Boards (FSMB) and the National Board of Medical Examiners (NBME).. They developed it originally to provide state medical boards in the United States with a common examination for all licensure applicants. However, over time it has also been extensively used by residency programs to  predict residency performance and screen residents for selection during the National Resident Matching Program.

Even though it was estimated that at least 60% of osteopathic medical students took at least one USMLE exam in 2020, physicians with D.O. degree are not required to take the USMLE for licensure or graduation. They are licensed as physicians by passing Parts I, II, and III of the COMLEX examination from the National Board of Osteopathic Medical Examiners.

History
The USMLE was created in the early 1990s. The program replaced the multiple examinations, including the NBME Part Examination program and the FSMB's Federation Licensing Examination (FLEX) program, that offered paths to medical licensing in the medical profession. 

The examination was originally imparted using pencil and paper. In 1999, computerized examination delivery was included. 

In 2004, an examination with standardized patients to assess clinical-skills was added to Step 2 of the USMLE (Step 2 Clinical Skills), and required for licensure beginning with the medical school graduating class of 2005. During the COVID-19 pandemic, USMLE Step 2CS was initially suspended and later discontinued.

A review of the program was enacted in 2009. USMLE claimed it was done with the intention of orienting the examination to support the licensing decisions made by medical boards, transitioning the exam to a competencies schema and emphasizing the importance of scientific foundations of medicine throughout the examination sequence. They also aimed to continue the assessment of clinical skill and interpretation of clinical information. 

USMLE announced a move to a pass/fail model on February 12, 2020, along with other changes. They claimed this was done in an attempt by the Federation of State Medical Boards (FSMB) and the National Board of Medical Examiners (NBME) to balance focus between exams and actual coursework. The change became effective in 2022.

Pass rates by exam

Controversies

USMLE response to COVID-19
The USMLE was met with criticism for their lack of adaptability during the COVID-19 pandemic. The criticism was two-fold: First, for the mishandling and poor communication of exam cancellations by both USMLE program administrators and the third-party exam administrator, Prometric. Second, the pandemic crisis exacerbated existing resentment towards the high-stakes nature of the exam: namely, several students and physicians were upset that the USMLE refused to move up the 2022 deadline of making Step 1 into a pass or fail exam.

Racial differences in outcome associated with the use of USMLE Step 1 scores to grant residency interviews
A study conducted in 2020 showed differences in USMLE Step 1 scores attributable to race and ethnicity, with lower mean scores for self-identified Black, Asian, and Hispanic examinees when compared with self-identified White examinees. The mean effect was larger when comparing Caucasian applicants (223) with Black and Hispanic applicants (216). Depending on the threshold score, an African American was 3–6x less likely to be offered an interview."
"61% of minority applicants were accepted into an orthopaedic residency versus 73% of White applicants. White and Asian applicants and residents had higher USMLE Step 1. White applicants and matriculated candidates had higher odds of Alpha Omega Alpha membership compared with Black, Hispanic, and other groups.
In 2020, the American Academy of Family Physicians and the Association of American Medical Colleges expressed their support for changing Step 1 to pass or fail, in part to reduce racial bias.

Financial considerations
The US Medical Licensing Examinations have received criticism due to their high cost. As of 2020, the USMLE charges:
 $645 for Step 1 for US students, $975 International medical graduates (IMGs)
 $645 for Step 2 CK US students, $975 IMG
 $895 for Step 3 for US students and IMGs

As part of a broader public plea for systemic changes to the improper use of USMLE exams, STAT wrote that this "multimillion-dollar industry has exploited the opportunity to extract thousands of dollars from already overly indebted students. Registering for STEP exams test cost $645–1300, while Step preparation materials and courses run much higher."

Similar exams
 The "Comprehensive Osteopathic Medical Licensing Examination" (COMLEX-USA) is required for osteopathic physicians in the United States
The American Podiatric Medical Licensing Examination (APMLE) is required for Podiatric Physicians in the United States.

In other countries
Ärztliche Prüfungen, overseen by the IMPP, in Germany
Australian Medical Council (AMC) examinations in Australia.
Examen Nacional de Aspirantes a Residencias Médicas (ENARM) in Mexico
Épreuves classantes nationales ECNi in France
Hong Kong Medical Licensing Examination (HKMLE) in Hong Kong.
Examination for Provisional Registration (EPR) in Malaysia.
Medical Council of Canada Qualifying Examination, in Canada
Pakistan Medical Commission NEBand NLE Exam,Pakistan
Medical Council of India (MCI-FMGE conducted by National Board of Examinations)
National Eligibility and Entrance Test, India
Nepal Medical Council, in Nepal.
National Examination for Medical Practitioners in Japan
 Professional and Linguistic Assessment Board test (similar exam used in United Kingdom)
Saudi Medical Licensing Examination (SMLE) in Saudi Arabia
Ujian Kompetensi Dokter Indonesia (UKDI) Indonesian Doctor Competence Examination, in Indonesia.
Bahrain Medical Licensure Examination (BLME) in Bahrain.
Kunskapsprov för läkare, overseen by Umeå University, in Sweden.

References

External links

For International medical graduates

 
1990s establishments in the United States

es:Examen Nacional de Aspirantes a Residencias Médicas
id:Uji Kompetensi Dokter Indonesia